Fowlea is a genus of snakes in the subfamily Natricinae of the family Colubridae. The genus is endemic to Asia.

Species
The following species are recognized as being valid.

Fowlea asperrima  – Boulenger's keelback
Fowlea flavipunctata  – yellow-spotted keelback   
Fowlea melanzosta  – Javan keelback water snake 
Fowlea piscator  – checkered keelback
Fowlea punctulata 
Fowlea sanctijohannis  – St. John's keelback
Fowlea schnurrenbergeri 
Fowlea unicolor 
Fowlea yunnanensis 
Some snakes of this genus, like the Boulenguer's keelback and Checkered keelback came originally from the genus Xenochrophis.

Nota bene: A binomial authority in parentheses indicates that the species was originally described in a genus other than Fowlea.

References

 
Snake genera
Taxa named by William Theobald